Karim Aribi (born 24 June 1994) is an Algerian professional footballer who plays as forward for Saudi Arabian club Al-Qadsiah and the Algeria national team.

Club career

Étoile Sahel
On 2 January 2019, Aribi joined to Étoile Sahel for four seasons, coming from DRB Tadjenanet. He made his debut for the team in the Ligue Professionnelle 1 during a win against Club Africain, later Aribi scored his first goal with the club against CS Hammam-Lif in 2–1 victory. On 18 April, in the Arab Club Champions Cup final against Al-Hilal, Aribi scored the first goal to lead Étoile Sahel to win the title, which is the first with his club. On 11 August, He made his debut in the CAF Champions League and in the same match scored his first goal against Hafia. two week later against the same club scored a super hat-trick. After the CAF Champions League ended Karim Aribi won the top scorer title with 11 goals.

Nîmes
On 2 October 2020, Aribi signed for Ligue 1 side Nîmes Olympique on a three-year contract.

Al-Qadsiah
On 30 January 2023, Aribi joined Saudi Arabian club Al-Qadsiah.

Career statistics

Club

Honours

Club
CR Belouizdad
 Algerian Cup: 2017

Étoile Sahel
Arab Club Champions Cup: 2018–19

References

External links
 

1994 births
Living people
Algerian footballers
Algeria international footballers
21st-century Algerian people
Association football forwards
JSM Béjaïa players
CA Batna players
CR Belouizdad players
DRB Tadjenanet players
Étoile Sportive du Sahel players
Nîmes Olympique players
Al-Qadsiah FC players
Algerian Ligue Professionnelle 1 players
Algerian Ligue 2 players
Ligue 1 players
Saudi First Division League players
Algerian expatriate footballers
Expatriate footballers in France
Algerian expatriate sportspeople in France
Expatriate footballers in Saudi Arabia
Algerian expatriate sportspeople in Saudi Arabia
Expatriate footballers in Tunisia
Algerian expatriate sportspeople in Tunisia
2022 African Nations Championship players
Algeria A' international footballers